Eagle Peak is the name of 44 mountain peaks of the United States including:
Eagle Peak (Alaska)
Eagle Peak (Admiralty Island), in Alaska
Eagle Peak (Washington), a summit in Mount Rainier National Park
Eagle Peak (Mariposa County, California), a rock formation in Yosemite National Park
Eagle Peak (Modoc County, California), part of the Warner Mountains
Eagle Peak (Mono County, California), a mountain in the Sierra Nevada
Eagle Peak (San Bernardino County, California), tallest in the Sacramento Mountains, California
Eagle Peak (San Diego County, California)
Eagle Peak (New Mexico)
Eagle Peak (Wyoming)
 Eagle Peak in Mineral County, Montana

Eagle Peak in Canada:
Eagle Peak, in the Selkirk Mountains of British Columbia